Em som maior is the only album recorded by Sambrasa Trio, a Brazilian group formed by Hermeto Pascoal, Humberto Clayber and Airto Moreira. It was released on an LP in 1965 and presents a fusion of various musical rhythms, including samba and jazz. In 2006, after long period of neglect, this album was reissued on CD as one of works included in Som Livre Masters series, organized by Charles Gavin.

Track listing

Personnel
Hermeto Pascoal  – piano, flute
Humberto Clayber  – bass, harmonica
Airto Moreira  – drums

References

1965 albums
Hermeto Pascoal albums
Samba albums
Som Livre albums